Karl Hjalmar Branting (23 November 1860 – 24 February 1925) was a Swedish politician who was the leader of the Swedish Social Democratic Party (SAP) from 1907 until his death in 1925, and three times Prime Minister of Sweden. When Branting came to power in 1920, he was the first Social Democratic Prime Minister of Sweden. When taking office for a second term after the general election of 1921, he became the first democratic socialist head of government in Western Europe elected under universal suffrage. An early supporter of modern social democracy and democratic socialism, he led the SAP through a transformation from a radical socialist movement to Sweden's dominant party; the Social Democrats have been Sweden's largest party in every election since 1914, and formed government for 44 continuous years from 1932 to 1976. 

In 1921, Branting shared the Nobel Peace Prize with the Norwegian secretary-general of the Inter-Parliamentary Union Christian Lous Lange.

Biography 
Born to the professor Lars Gabriel Branting and the noblewoman and pianist Emma af Georgii, Branting was educated in Stockholm and at Uppsala University. He developed a scientific background in mathematical astronomy and was an assistant at the Stockholm Observatory, but gave up his devotion to scientific work to become a journalist in 1884 and began editing the newspapers Tiden and Social-Demokraten. The latter was official media outlet of the Swedish Social Democratic Party. His decision to publish an article by the more radical socialist Axel Danielsson, a piece denounced by opponents as insulting to religious sensitivities, resulted in political convictions for blasphemy and imprisonment for both men. Branting was imprisoned for three months in 1888.

Together with August Palm, Branting was one of the main organizers of the Swedish Social Democratic Party in 1889. He was its first Member of Parliament from 1896 and for six years the only one.

In the early years of the 20th century, Branting led the Social Democrats in opposing a war to force Norway to remain in a personal union with Sweden. When the crisis came in 1905, he coined the slogan "Hands off Norway, King!" The Social Democrats organized resistance to a call-up of reserves and made preparations for a general strike against a war; historians now acclaim this as a major factor in Norway's peaceful independence. In 1908 Branting established a monthly theoretical political journal entitled Tiden which is still in publication.

Branting accepted Eduard Bernstein's revision of Marxism and became a reformist socialist, advocating a peaceful transition from capitalism towards socialism. He believed that if workers were given the vote through universal suffrage, socialist legislation could be brought through the Riksdag. Branting supported the February Revolution in Russia in 1917. He supported the moderate Mensheviks against Lenin's more extreme Bolsheviks and defended the government of Alexander Kerensky, whom he even personally visited in Petrograd. When the October Revolution broke out in the winter of that year, Branting condemned the Bolshevik seizure of power. 1917 saw a split in the Swedish Social Democratic Party on this question, and the youth league and the revolutionary sections of the party broke away and formed the Social Democratic Left Party of Sweden, initially headed by Zeth Höglund, which soon reorganized as the Swedish Communist Party. Höglund later returned to the Social Democratic Party after Branting's death, and wrote a two-volume biography of Branting.

As Prime Minister, Branting brought Sweden into the League of Nations and was personally active as a delegate within it. When the question of whether Åland should be handed over to Sweden after the independence of Finland from Russia was brought up, he let the League decide upon the issue; the islands became an autonomous region of Finland. He was awarded the Nobel Peace Prize in 1921 for his work in the League of Nations, sharing the prize with the Norwegian Christian Lous Lange.

Branting died in Stockholm at the age of 64 on 24 February 1925 four months after being sworn in for a third term as Prime Minister following the SAP's victory in the 1924 general election. He was succeeded as Prime Minister by Rickard Sandler; Per Albin Hansson became party chairman, later serving as Prime Minister from 1932 to 1946.

Monuments and memorials 

Branting is commemorated by the Branting Monument in Stockholm. Additionally in Gothenburg, there is a tram and bus interchange named after Branting (Swedish: Hjalmar Brantingsplatsen). Stockholms Plads (Stockholm Square) in Copenhagen was renamed Hjalmar Brantings Plads in 1925.

See also 
 1921 Swedish general election

References

External links 

 
 
 
 

1860 births
1925 deaths
People convicted of blasphemy
Politicians from Stockholm
Prime Ministers of Sweden
Leaders of the Swedish Social Democratic Party
Members of the Executive of the Labour and Socialist International
Members of the Riksdag from the Social Democrats
Nobel Peace Prize laureates
Swedish democracy activists
Swedish Ministers for Finance
Swedish Ministers for Foreign Affairs
Swedish Nobel laureates
Uppsala University alumni
20th-century Swedish politicians
19th-century Swedish politicians
Swedish newspaper editors
Swedish magazine founders